Conceição Aparecida Geremias (born July 23, 1956 in Campinas, São Paulo) is a retired female pentathlete, heptathlete and long jumper from Brazil.

Biography
She won the gold medal at the 1983 Pan American Games in Caracas. She is a three-time Olympian.

Achievements

External links
 
 
 

1956 births
Living people
Brazilian pentathletes
Brazilian heptathletes
Brazilian female long jumpers
Brazilian female pole vaulters
Brazilian female sprinters
Brazilian female hurdlers
Olympic athletes of Brazil
Athletes (track and field) at the 1980 Summer Olympics
Athletes (track and field) at the 1984 Summer Olympics
Athletes (track and field) at the 1988 Summer Olympics
Pan American Games athletes for Brazil
Pan American Games gold medalists for Brazil
Pan American Games medalists in athletics (track and field)
Athletes (track and field) at the 1975 Pan American Games
Athletes (track and field) at the 1983 Pan American Games
World Athletics Championships athletes for Brazil
Sportspeople from Campinas
Medalists at the 1983 Pan American Games
20th-century Brazilian women